Anouk Nieuwenweg (born 20 August 1996) is a Dutch handballer who plays for Neckarsulmer SU and the Netherlands national team. 

She arrived this summer (2019), from Germany, in the club of Chambray Touraine Handball, in France.

References

External links
 

  
1996 births 
Living people
Dutch female handball players
Sportspeople from Emmen, Netherlands